The Muketei River is a river in northeastern Kenora District in northwestern Ontario, Canada. It is in the James Bay drainage basin and is a left tributary of the Attawapiskat River.

The Muketei River begins at an unnamed lake and flows northeast then east to its mouth at the Attawapiskat River, which flows to James Bay.

References

Sources

"Muketei River" at Atlas of Canada. Accessed 2016-05-03.

Rivers of Kenora District